Desktop sharing is a common name for technologies and products that allow remote access and remote collaboration on a person's computer desktop through a graphical terminal emulator.

The most common two scenarios for desktop sharing are:

 Remote login
 Real-time collaboration

Remote log-in allows users to connect to their own desktop while being physically away from their computer. Systems that support the X Window System, typically Unix-based ones, have this ability "built in". Windows versions starting from Windows 2000 have a built-in solution for remote access as well in the form of Remote Desktop Protocol and prior to that in the form of Microsoft’s NetMeeting.

Virtual Network Computing (VNC) is a cross-platform solution accomplished through a common client/server model. The client, or VNC viewer, is installed on a local computer and then connects to the network via a server component, which is installed on a remote computer. In a typical VNC session, all keystrokes and mouse clicks are registered as if the client were actually performing tasks on the end-user machine.

The shortcoming of the above solutions are their inability to work outside of a single NAT environment. A number of commercial products overcome this restriction by tunneling the traffic through rendezvous servers.

Apple machines require Apple Remote Desktop (ARD).

Real-time collaboration is a bigger area of desktop sharing use and has gained momentum as an important component of rich multimedia communications. 
Desktop sharing, when used in conjunction with other components of multimedia communications such as audio and video, offers people to meet and work together. On the larger scale, this area is also referred as web conferencing.

With a larger number of applications moving from desktop machines to cloud computing, newer forms of browser based instant screen sharing have developed such as Cobrowsing.

Comparison of notable desktop sharing software

See also
 Comparison of remote desktop software
 Collaborative real-time editor
 Desktop virtualization

References

Collaboration
Remote desktop